Deh-e Borzu (also Romanized as Deh-e Borzū and Deh Borzū) is a village in Bala Velayat Rural District, Bala Velayat District, Bakharz County, Razavi Khorasan Province, Iran. At the 2006 census, its population was 504, in 116 families.

References 

Populated places in Bakharz County